{{DISPLAYTITLE:C14H19NO}}
The molecular formula C14H19NO may refer to:

 Alpha-Pyrrolidinobutiophenone
 Ethoxyquin, a food preservative
 Eticyclidone
 2'-Oxo-PCE
 4'-Methyl-α-pyrrolidinopropiophenone

Molecular formulas